The planet Neptune has 14 known moons, which are named for minor water deities in Greek mythology. By far the largest of them is Triton, discovered by William Lassell on October 10, 1846, 17 days after the discovery of Neptune itself. Over a century passed before the discovery of the second natural satellite, Nereid. Neptune's outermost moon Neso, which has an orbital period of about 27 Julian years, orbits farther from its planet than any other moon in the Solar System.

Triton is unique among moons of planetary mass in that its orbit is retrograde to Neptune's rotation and inclined relative to Neptune's equator, which suggests that it did not form in orbit around Neptune but was instead gravitationally captured by it. The next-largest satellite in the Solar System suspected to be captured, Saturn's moon Phoebe, has only 0.03% of Triton's mass. The capture of Triton, probably occurring some time after Neptune formed a satellite system, was a catastrophic event for Neptune's original satellites, disrupting their orbits so that they collided to form a rubble disc. Triton is massive enough to have achieved hydrostatic equilibrium and to retain a thin atmosphere capable of forming clouds and hazes.

Inward of Triton are seven small regular satellites, all of which have prograde orbits in planes that lie close to Neptune's equatorial plane; some of these orbit among Neptune's rings. The largest of them is Proteus. They were re-accreted from the rubble disc generated after Triton's capture after the Tritonian orbit became circular. Neptune also has six more outer irregular satellites other than Triton, including Nereid, whose orbits are much farther from Neptune and at high inclination: three of these have prograde orbits, while the remainder have retrograde orbits. In particular, Nereid has an unusually close and eccentric orbit for an irregular satellite, suggesting that it may have once been a regular satellite that was significantly perturbed to its current position when Triton was captured. The two outermost Neptunian irregular satellites, Psamathe and Neso, have the largest orbits of any natural satellites discovered in the Solar System to date.

History

Discovery

Triton was discovered by William Lassell in 1846, just seventeen days after the discovery of Neptune. Nereid was discovered by Gerard P. Kuiper in 1949. The third moon, later named Larissa, was first observed by Harold J. Reitsema, William B. Hubbard, Larry A. Lebofsky and David J. Tholen on May 24, 1981. The astronomers were observing a star's close approach to Neptune, looking for rings similar to those discovered around Uranus four years earlier. If rings were present, the star's luminosity would decrease slightly just before the planet's closest approach. The star's luminosity dipped only for several seconds, which meant that it was due to a moon rather than a ring.

No further moons were found until Voyager 2 flew by Neptune in 1989. Voyager 2 rediscovered Larissa and discovered five inner moons: Naiad, Thalassa, Despina, Galatea and Proteus. In 2001 two surveys using large ground-based telescopes found five additional outer moons, bringing the total to thirteen. Follow-up surveys by two teams in 2002 and 2003 respectively re-observed all five of these moons, which are Halimede, Sao, Psamathe, Laomedeia, and Neso. A sixth candidate moon was also found in the 2002 survey but was lost thereafter.

In 2013 Mark R. Showalter discovered Hippocamp while examining Hubble Space Telescope images of Neptune's ring arcs from 2009. He used a technique similar to panning to compensate for orbital motion and allow stacking of multiple images to bring out faint details. After deciding on a whim to expand the search area to radii well beyond the rings, he found an unambiguous dot that represented the new moon. He then found it repeatedly in other archival HST images going back to 2004. Voyager 2, which had observed all of Neptune's other inner satellites, did not detect it during its 1989 flyby, due to its dimness.

Names

Triton did not have an official name until the twentieth century. The name "Triton" was suggested by Camille Flammarion in his 1880 book Astronomie Populaire, but it did not come into common use until at least the 1930s. Until this time it was usually simply known as "the satellite of Neptune". Other moons of Neptune are also named for Greek and Roman water gods, in keeping with Neptune's position as god of the sea: either from Greek mythology, usually children of Poseidon, the Greek Neptune (Triton, Proteus, Despina, Thalassa); lovers of Poseidon (Larissa); classes of minor Greek water deities (Naiad, Nereid); or specific Nereids (Halimede, Galatea, Neso, Sao, Laomedeia, Psamathe). The most recently discovered moon, Hippocamp, was left unnamed from 2013 until 2019, when it was named after the Hippocamp, a mythological creature that was half horse and half fish.

For the "normal" irregular satellites, the general convention is to use names ending in "a" for prograde satellites, names ending in "e" for retrograde satellites, and names ending in "o" for exceptionally inclined satellites, exactly like the convention for the moons of Jupiter. Two asteroids share the same names as moons of Neptune: 74 Galatea and 1162 Larissa.

Characteristics
The moons of Neptune can be divided into two groups: regular and irregular. The first group includes the seven inner moons, which follow circular prograde orbits lying in the equatorial plane of Neptune. The second group consists of all seven other moons including Triton. They generally follow inclined eccentric and often retrograde orbits far from Neptune; the only exception is Triton, which orbits close to the planet following a circular orbit, though retrograde and inclined.

Regular moons
In order of distance from Neptune, the regular moons are Naiad, Thalassa, Despina, Galatea, Larissa, Hippocamp, and Proteus. All but the outer two are within Neptune-synchronous orbit (Neptune's rotational period is 0.6713 day or 16 hours) and thus are being tidally decelerated. Naiad, the closest regular moon, is also the second smallest among the inner moons (following the discovery of Hippocamp), whereas Proteus is the largest regular moon and the second largest moon of Neptune. The first five moons orbit much faster than Neptune's rotation itself ranging from 7 hours for Naiad and Thalassa, to 13 hours for Larissa.

The inner moons are closely associated with Neptune's rings. The two innermost satellites, Naiad and Thalassa, orbit between the Galle and LeVerrier rings. Despina may be a shepherd moon of the LeVerrier ring, because its orbit lies just inside this ring. The next moon, Galatea, orbits just inside the most prominent of Neptune's rings, the Adams ring. This ring is very narrow, with a width not exceeding 50 km, and has five embedded bright arcs. The gravity of Galatea helps confine the ring particles within a limited region in the radial direction, maintaining the narrow ring. Various resonances between the ring particles and Galatea may also have a role in maintaining the arcs.

Only the two largest regular moons have been imaged with a resolution sufficient to discern their shapes and surface features. Larissa, about 200 km in diameter, is elongated. Proteus is not significantly elongated, but not fully spherical either: it resembles an irregular polyhedron, with several flat or slightly concave facets 150 to 250 km in diameter. At about 400 km in diameter, it is larger than the Saturnian moon Mimas, which is fully ellipsoidal. This difference may be due to a past collisional disruption of Proteus. The surface of Proteus is heavily cratered and shows a number of linear features. Its largest crater, Pharos, is more than 150 km in diameter.

All of Neptune's inner moons are dark objects: their geometric albedo ranges from 7 to 10%. Their spectra indicate that they are made from water ice contaminated by some very dark material, probably complex organic compounds. In this respect, the inner Neptunian moons are similar to the inner Uranian moons.

Irregular moons

In order of their distance from the planet, the irregular moons are Triton, Nereid, Halimede, Sao, Laomedeia, Psamathe, and Neso, a group that includes both prograde and retrograde objects. The five outermost moons are similar to the irregular moons of other giant planets, and are thought to have been gravitationally captured by Neptune, unlike the regular satellites, which probably formed in situ.

Triton and Nereid are unusual irregular satellites and are thus treated separately from the other five irregular Neptunian moons, which are more like the outer irregular satellites of the other outer planets. Firstly, they are the largest two known irregular moons in the Solar System, with Triton being almost an order of magnitude larger than all other known irregular moons. Secondly, they both have atypically small semi-major axes, with Triton's being over an order of magnitude smaller than those of all other known irregular moons. Thirdly, they both have unusual orbital eccentricities: Nereid has one of the most eccentric orbits of any known irregular satellite, and Triton's orbit is a nearly perfect circle. Finally, Nereid also has the lowest inclination of any known irregular satellite.

Triton

Triton follows a retrograde and quasi-circular orbit, and is thought to be a gravitationally captured satellite. It was the second moon in the Solar System that was discovered to have a substantial atmosphere, which is primarily nitrogen with small amounts of methane and carbon monoxide. The pressure on Triton's surface is about 14 μbar. In 1989 the Voyager 2 spacecraft observed what appeared to be clouds and hazes in this thin atmosphere. Its surface is covered by nitrogen, methane, carbon dioxide and water ices and has a high geometric albedo of more than 70%. The Bond albedo is even higher, reaching up to 90%. Surface features include the large southern polar cap, older cratered planes cross-cut by graben and scarps, as well as youthful features probably formed by endogenic processes like cryovolcanism. Voyager 2 observations revealed a number of active geysers within the polar cap heated by the Sun, which eject plumes to the height of up to 8 km. Triton has a relatively high density of about 2 g/cm3 indicating that rocks constitute about two thirds of its mass, and ices (mainly water ice) the remaining one third. There may be a layer of liquid water deep inside Triton, forming a subterranean ocean. Because of its retrograde orbit and relative proximity to Neptune (closer than the Moon is to Earth), tidal deceleration is causing Triton to spiral inward, which will lead to its destruction in about 3.6 billion years.

Nereid

Nereid is the third-largest moon of Neptune. It has a prograde but very eccentric orbit and is believed to be a former regular satellite that was scattered to its current orbit through gravitational interactions during Triton's capture. Water ice has been spectroscopically detected on its surface. Early measurements of Nereid showed large, irregular variations in its visible magnitude, which were speculated to be caused by forced precession or chaotic rotation combined with an elongated shape and bright or dark spots on the surface. This was disproved in 2016, when observations from the Kepler space telescope showed only minor variations. Thermal modeling based on infrared observations from the Spitzer and Herschel space telescopes suggest that Nereid is only moderately elongated which disfavours forced precession of the rotation. The thermal model also indicates that the surface roughness of Nereid is very high, likely similar to the Saturnian moon Hyperion.

Normal irregular moons
Among the remaining irregular moons, Sao and Laomedeia follow prograde orbits, whereas Halimede, Psamathe and Neso follow retrograde orbits. Given the similarity of their orbits, it was suggested that Neso and Psamathe could have a common origin in the break-up of a larger moon. Psamathe and Neso have the largest orbits of any natural satellites discovered in the Solar system to date. They take over 25 years to orbit Neptune at an average of 125 times the distance between Earth and the Moon. Neptune has the largest Hill sphere in the Solar System, owing primarily to its large distance from the Sun; this allows it to retain control of such distant moons. Nevertheless, the Jovian moons in the Carme and Pasiphae groups orbit at a greater percentage of their primary's Hill radius than Psamathe and Neso.

Formation
The mass distribution of the Neptunian moons is the most lopsided of the satellite systems of the giant planets in the Solar System. One moon, Triton, makes up nearly all of the mass of the system, with all other moons together comprising only one third of one percent. This is similar to the moon system of Saturn, where Titan makes up more than 95% of the total mass, but is different from the more balanced systems of Jupiter and Uranus. The reason for the lopsidedness of the present Neptunian system is that Triton was captured well after the formation of Neptune's original satellite system, and experts conjecture much of the system was destroyed in the process of capture.

Triton's orbit upon capture would have been highly eccentric, and would have caused chaotic perturbations in the orbits of the original inner Neptunian satellites, causing them to collide and reduce to a disc of rubble. This means it is likely that Neptune's present inner satellites are not the original bodies that formed with Neptune. Only after Triton's orbit became circularised could some of the rubble re-accrete into the present-day regular moons.

The mechanism of Triton's capture has been the subject of several theories over the years. One of them postulates that Triton was captured in a three-body encounter. In this scenario, Triton is the surviving member of a binary Kuiper belt object disrupted by its encounter with Neptune.

Numerical simulations show that there is a 0.41 probability that the moon Halimede collided with Nereid at some time in the past. Although it is not known whether any collision has taken place, both moons appear to have similar ("grey") colors, implying that Halimede could be a fragment of Nereid.

List

Confirmed moons

The Neptunian moons are listed here by orbital period, from shortest to longest. Irregular (captured) moons are marked by color. The orbits and mean distances of the irregular moons are variable over short timescales due to frequent planetary and solar perturbations, therefore the listed orbital elements of all irregular moons are averaged over an 800-year numerical integration. Their orbital elements are all based on the epoch of 1 January 2020. Triton, the only Neptunian moon massive enough for its surface to have collapsed into a spheroid, is emboldened.

Unconfirmed moons
A sixth candidate for an irregular satellite of Neptune, designated 'c02N4', was discovered in a survey led by Matthew J. Holman on 14 August 2002, but was only seen again by the Very Large Telescope on 3 September 2002 before being lost thereafter. Further attempts to recover the object failed, leaving its orbit undetermined. It may have been a centaur instead of a satellite, although its small amount of motion relative to Neptune over a month suggests that it was indeed a satellite. Based on its brightness, the object was estimated to have a diameter of 33 km and to have been about 25.1 million km (0.168 AU) from Neptune when it was found.

See also
List of natural satellites

Notes

References

External links

Scott S. Sheppard: Neptune Moons
Neptune's Moons by NASA's Solar System Exploration
Gazetteer of Planetary Nomenclature—Neptune (USGS)
Simulation showing the position of Neptune's Moon

 
Lists of moons
Articles containing video clips